Serhat Akyüz (born 10 August 1984 in Maçka) is a Turkish football defender of Tekirdağspor.

References

External links
 
 
 

1984 births
Living people
Turkish footballers
Çaykur Rizespor footballers
İstanbulspor footballers
Balıkesirspor footballers
Süper Lig players
People from Maçka
Association football defenders
Mediterranean Games silver medalists for Turkey
Mediterranean Games medalists in football
Competitors at the 2005 Mediterranean Games